Tygyn Darkhan (?–1632) was a legendary Yakut hero and the subject of many tales, a chief of the Kangalas ulus (clan), the king of the Yakuts.

History 
According to Yakut legend, Tygyn was a descendant of Badzhei (Баджей), who was also known in Yakut legends in the 19th-20th centuries as "Doidusa Darkhan" (Дойдуса Дархан) or "Tyusyulge Darkhaan" (Тюсюлге Дархан). Tyusyulge had two sons,  (Мунньан Дархан) and Mold'ogor (Молдьогор), and Munn'an Darkhan had two sons of his own, Tygyn and Usun Oyuun (Усун Ойуун).

Tygyn was renowned for his tall height in Yakut legends. When Tygyn succeeded his father Tyusyulge as Toyon-usa (Chief King), he unified the other Yakut clans into a single nation and became a wealthy landowner who lived around Lake Saysara. However, when his armies faced the newly arrived Russians in 1628, they were defeated by the latter's firearms, and the Russian army captured Tygyn and held him as a prisoner. After suffering from a poor skin condition, he died in prison in 1632.

His son Bedzheke was captured and placed into prison in his father's place, while another son, Ökrey, succeeded his father Tygyn as the next Toyon-usa of the Yakuts.

External links 
 Yakutia-17th century and the Russian invasion
 Борисов А. А. Якутский тойон Тыгын исторический и легендарный. 
 ТЫГЫН – ЧЕЛОВЕК, ЛЕГЕНДА, СИМВОЛ. 

Yakut people